BRP Francisco Dagohoy (MMOV-5002) (also known as DA BRAR MMOV 5002) is one of two multi-mission offshore civilian patrol vessels operated by the Philippine government's Bureau of Fisheries and Aquatic Resources. The ship was built by Josefa Slipways, Inc. in Navotas. It was launched on August 10, 2017 and was commissioned into service on December 21, 2017. Its intended mission is to guard Philippine waters against illegal fishing.

See also 
BRP Lapu-Lapu (MMOV-5001)

References 

Patrol vessels of the Philippines
Ships of the Bureau of Fisheries and Aquatic Resources
2017 ships